Cerro Columa, or Cerro Colluma, is a crater in Bolivia. In 1964 it was considered to be a crater formed by volcanism. The crater was most likely formed by the collapse of a sediment dome, an origin as a meteorite crater is less likely.

The crater lies on a poorly vegetated desert plain that slopes to Salar de Coipasa.

Sources

Maars of Bolivia
Volcanoes of Oruro Department